Bütün Dünya (English: "Whole World") is a monthly Turkish periodical.

The magazine was published from 1948 to 1984 in a format similar to the American Reader's Digest. After a long pause, it resumed publishing after 1998 by the Başkent University. Mete Akyol was the executive editor until his death in 2016.

As of 2017, the masthead gave the staff as:

Owner: Professor Mehmet Haberal (on behalf of Başkent University)
Executive editor: Mete Akyol (after his death Ufuk Akyol)
Managing editor: Gülçin Orkut
Technical manager: Faruk Güney
Publication advisor: Yaşar Öztürk
Turkish language advisor: Haydar Göfer
Art advisor: Süheyla Dinç
Education advisor: Dr. Fatma Ataman

References

External links
 Bütün Dünya on line 

1948 establishments in Turkey
General interest digests
Magazines established in 1948
Magazines published in Istanbul
Turkish-language magazines
Monthly magazines published in Turkey
Lifestyle magazines published in Turkey
Başkent University